Società Sportiva Lazio finished fourth in Serie A, reached the quarter final of the Coppa Italia and the round of 32 in the UEFA Cup.

Players

Goalkeepers
  Luca Marchegiani
  Fernando Orsi
  Carlo Cudicini

Defenders
  Paolo Negro
  Mark Fish
  Giuseppe Favalli
  José Chamot
  Alessandro Nesta
  Guerino Gottardi
  Alessandro Grandoni

Midfielders
  Dario Marcolin
  Renato Buso
  Diego Fuser
  Roberto Baronio
  Paul Okon
  Pavel Nedvěd
  Daniele Franceschini
  Marco Piovanelli
  Giorgio Venturin
  Roberto Rambaudi

Forwards
  Giuseppe Signori
  Pierluigi Casiraghi
  Igor Protti

Transfers

Winter

Competitions

Serie A

League table

Results by round

Matches

Coppa Italia

Second round

Round of 16

Quarter-finals

UEFA Cup

First round

Second round

Statistics

Players statistics

Goalscorers
  Giuseppe Signori 15 (4)
  Pierluigi Casiraghi 8
  Igor Protti 7
  Pavel Nedvěd 7
  Diego Fuser 4

References

S.S. Lazio seasons
Lazio